Macau competed at the 2019 World Aquatics Championships in Gwangju, South Korea from 12 to 28 July.

Artistic swimming

Macau entered six artistic swimmers.

Women

Diving

Macau entered four divers.

Women

Swimming

Macau entered four swimmers.

Men

Women

References

Macau at the World Aquatics Championships
2019 in Macau sport
Swimming in Macau
Nations at the 2019 World Aquatics Championships